Parveen Hooda is an Indian amateur boxer who won a gold medal at the 2019 South Asian Games and bronze medal at the 2022 World Championships.

References

Living people
Indian women boxers
Sportswomen from Haryana
Year of birth missing (living people)
21st-century Indian women